Tashkurgan is a town in Tashkurgan Tajik Autonomous County, Xinjiang, China.

Tashkurgan may also refer to:
Tashkurgan County, formally known as Tashkurgan Tajik Autonomous County, in Xinjiang, China
Tashkurgan, a former name of Kholm, Afghanistan, a town in Northern Afghanistan
Tash-Kurgan, Kyrgyzstan, a town in Southwest Kyrgyzstan
Tashkurgan, Tajikistan, a village on the upper reaches of the Bartang River
Tashkurgan River, a river in Xinjiang, China
Tashkurgan River, also known as Khulm River, a river in Afghanistan